Mazahir Uloom Jadeed is an Islamic seminary in Saharanpur, India, which split from the Mazahir Uloom as an independent and separate seminary in 1983. It publishes a monthly journal entitled Mazāhir-e-Uloom. As of March 2022, Muhammad Aaqil Saharanpuri is the rector and senior professor of hadith at the seminary.

History

The seminary appointed Abdul Azīz as its first rector who served the position from 1986 to 1991. Salman Mazahiri served on the administration from 1996 to 20 July 2020.

It adopted the position of "Ameen-e-Aam" (General Secretary) in 1988 appointing Muhammad Talha Kandhlawi as the first General Secretary who served the position until 1993.

Alumni and faculty
 Abdur Rahman ibn Yusuf Mangera
 Muhammad Yunus Jaunpuri, seminary's former professor of hadith.
 Salman Mazahiri, former rector

References

Citations

Bibliography
 

Deobandi Islamic universities and colleges
Madrasas in India
Saharanpur